Studio One is an American anthology drama television series that was adapted to from a radio series. It was created in 1947 by Canadian director Fletcher Markle for CBS. It premiered on November 7, 1948 and ended on September 29, 1958, with a total of 467 episodes over the course of 10 seasons.

Series overview

Episodes

Season 1 (1948–49)

Season 2 (1949–50)

Season 3 (1950–51)

Season 4 (1951–52)

Season 5 (1952–53)

Season 6 (1953–54)

Season 7 (1954–55)

Season 8 (1955–56)

Season 9 (1956–57)

Season 10 (1957–58)

References

External links
 

Studio One
Studio One (American TV series)